Ridgelands Regional Park is a future regional park to be developed in Pleasanton, CA by the East Bay Regional Park District.  The concept is expected to be developed over many years; the core has already been put in place as the Pleasanton Ridge Regional Park, a  park west of Pleasanton and north of Sunol, that overlooks Pleasanton and the Livermore Valley from the west.

References

External links
 East Bay Regional Parks website
 Pleasanton Ridge Regional Park webpage

East Bay Regional Park District
Parks in Alameda County, California